John Wilson Dempsey (1907-1951) was an Australian rugby league footballer who played in the 1920s.

Career
Regarded by many as one of the best halfbacks that came from the Newcastle area, Jack 'Inky' Dempsey came to Sydney for one season and played for St. George in 1929. He later captain/coached many country teams including Moree, New South Wales. He represented Newcastle against touring English teams on three occasions 1928, 1932 and 1936. 'Inky' Dempsey retired from playing in 1937 at Kurri Kurri, New South Wales.

Tragic death
Jack 'Inky' Dempsey collapsed and died in a wild brawl on the hill at the Sydney Cricket Ground during a Test Match between Australia v France on 21 July 1951. His lifeless body was carried down from the 'Hill' and placed on a stretcher on the SCG pitch in view of all 67,000 spectators.   He left a wife and three children, and was buried at Sandgate Cemetery on 24 July 1951.

References

St. George Dragons players
Australian rugby league players
Rugby league halfbacks
New South Wales rugby league team players
Country New South Wales rugby league team players
1907 births
1951 deaths